Greatest Hits is a collection of songs by Devo released in 1990.  The album includes several photos from previous albums, and the first half of an article on the band by Howie Klein.  The second half of this article appears in the accompanying material for Devo's Greatest Misses.

Track listing

Personnel

Devo
Bob Casale – rhythm guitar, keyboards, vocals
Gerald Casale – vocals, bass guitar, keyboards
Bob Mothersbaugh – lead guitar, vocals
Mark Mothersbaugh – vocals, keyboards, guitar
Alan Myers – drums

Technical
Devo – producer (1, 2, 5, 7, 15), co-producer (9–11, 14)
Ivan Ivan – remixing (1)
Roy Thomas Baker – producer (3, 4, 6)
Brian Eno – producer (8, 13, 16)
Robert Margouleff – co-producer (9–11, 14)
Ken Scott – producer, engineer (12)
Kathe Duba-Noland – album compilation
Gerald Casale – album compilation, art devotion
Mark Mothersbaugh – album compilation
Tim Stedman – art devotion
Alex Remlyn – devography
General Boy – liner notes
Howie Klein – liner notes
Janet Perr – photography
Karen Filter – photography
Effective Graphics – computer graphics

References

Devo compilation albums
1990 greatest hits albums
Warner Records compilation albums